"Unholy" is a song by British singer Sam Smith and German singer Kim Petras. It was released on 22 September 2022 as the second single from Smith's fourth studio album Gloria (2023).

"Unholy" entered at the top of the UK Singles Chart. Outside the United Kingdom, "Unholy" topped the charts in Australia, Austria, Canada, Ireland, New Zealand, and the United States, as well as the Global 200, becoming both Smith's and Petras' first chart topper in the latter two, and peaked within the top ten of the charts in Petras' native Germany, Belgium, the Netherlands, Norway, Sweden, France, Indonesia and the top 20 in Italy.

The song won the award for Best Pop Duo/Group Performance at the 65th Annual Grammy Awards, marking Smith's first award since 2015 and Petras's first award overall. It was also nominated for the Brit Award for Song of the Year at the Brit Awards 2023, Smith's fourth nomination in the category and Petras' first Brit nomination in any category.

Background
Prior to the release of "Unholy", British singer Sam Smith earned global recognition for ballads released throughout the 2010s as well as occasional features on songs by EDM producers, including on Naughty Boy's 2013 song "La La La" and on Disclosure's 2012 song "Latch". Smith came out as non-binary in 2019 after announcing their preference for they/them pronouns. Kim Petras, a German singer-songwriter, had previously made dance music before "Unholy".

"Unholy" was recorded in Jamaica and produced by Ilya and Omer Fedi. It was first teased in mid-August through a clip on TikTok, which shows Smith and Petras dancing in a recording studio to a snippet of the song that went viral and spurred a trend of sexually charged, thirst trap-style videos on the platform. Disclosure also teased the song, playing their remix of it in live sets. On 25 August, Smith announced the track's title and a pre-save link. It was released as a single on 22 September 2022.

Composition
A sexually charged and suggestive synthpop, dance-pop, alt-pop, 
and R&B song, "Unholy" marked a return to EDM and a deviation from sentimental ballads for Smith. It uses a scale associated with Indian and Arabic music and features choir-like vocals, a "grinding" bassline, a string section, and metallic hyperpop-style synths popularized by Scottish musician Sophie.

Its lyrics are about an adulterous family man who goes to a strip club behind his wife's back to have sex. Smith described it as being about "liberating oneself from the clutches of others' secrets". In its hook, Smith sings, "Mummy don't know Daddy's getting hot/At the Body Shop/Doing something unholy"—referencing the Body Shop, the first all-nude strip club on the Sunset Strip in Hollywood—accompanied by an "oh-wee-oh-wee-oh" chant popularized by the winged monkeys from the 1939 film The Wizard of Oz. Petras's verse features braggadocio and sees her asking her lover to buy her luxury clothing. Chris Molanphy of Slate remarked upon the song's "sinister edge" and "high-camp energy" and compared it to "early-2010s peak-EDM era" pop music by artists such as Avicii and Kesha. Neil McCormick of The Telegraph described it as "a cross between a Brecht & Weill cabaret showstopper and a Pet Shop Boys electro stomp".

Critical reception and accolades
In a review of Gloria, Helen Brown of The Independent called "Unholy" the "stand-out banger" of the album, while Elly Watson of DIY picked it as an "undoubted standout" from the album, where, according to her, its "catchy melodies" were "elsewhere untouchable". The Sydney Morning Heralds Annabel Ross called it "promising" compared to other "inoffensive" songs on the album. For Variety, Jem Aswad wrote that "Unholy" was "one of the most musically innovative and unusual songs in years" to top the Billboard Hot 100. It was praised as an "inescapably catchy" "masterpiece of oversexualised nonsense" that "leaves everything else [on Gloria] feeling rather grey" by the Evening Standards David Smyth. AllMusic's Andy Kellman called the song "[Smith's] most distinctive dance-pop song since 'Latch'" and "without doubt anomalous in Smith's songbook".

Slates Chris Molanphy wrote that "Unholy" was "serviceable radio fodder" that was "almost conventional in its adherence to Top 40 trends" and that he "waver[ed] between delight and annoyance at [the song's] hook". For Pitchfork, Jamieson Cox wrote that "Unholy" "sound[ed] worse in an album-length context" and that its "its transgressive glee scann[ed] as shallow and theatrical up against more grounded, mature material" on Gloria. Petras's verse was called "trite" by Mark Richardson of The Wall Street Journal and "unimpressive" by Riley Moquin of The Line of Best Fit.

At the 65th Annual Grammy Awards, Petras and Smith also won the Best Pop Duo/Group Performance award for "Unholy", making Petras the first openly transgender artist to win a major-category Grammy Award.

Commercial performance
"Unholy" entered atop the UK Singles Chart on 30 September 2022, becoming Smith's eighth UK number-one to date (putting them on par with Oasis and the Rolling Stones) and Petras's first, having racked up 5.9 million streams in the UK in its first week. The song also debuted at number one on the ARIA Singles Chart, making it Smith's second number-one single in Australia and Petras's first.

In the US, the song debuted at number three on the Billboard Hot 100 for the chart issue dated 8 October 2022. It earned Petras her first career entry on the chart and became Smith's seventh top ten on the chart, as well as the eighth song to debut in the top three of the Hot 100 in 2022. It ascended to number two in its second week on the chart, blocked from the top by Steve Lacy's "Bad Habit". In its fourth week, it reached number one, becoming the first song from either artist to reach the top of the charts and Smith's highest charting single, surpassing 2014's "Stay with Me" which peaked at number two. The song reaching the top of the Hot 100 made history as Petras became the first openly transgender woman to reach number one on the chart, and Smith became the first openly non-binary person to do so. The collaboration tallied 25.3 million streams, 21.5 million radio airplay audience impressions and 19,000 downloads sold.

Music video
The song's music video, directed by Floria Sigismondi, was released on 30 September 2022. The visual features a woman attending a sexually charged cabaret show at "The Body Shop" after following clues about her husband's cheating at the club. Smith appears as the MC of the club surrounded by androgynous burlesque dancers, joined by RuPaul's Drag Race alums Violet Chachki and Gottmik. Petras then arrives onstage in a heart-shaped lyra before dancing atop a prop car dressed in an outfit reminiscent of Madonna. The erotic video, inspired by A Clockwork Orange and Bob Fosse, also features a cameo from gay porn star Paddy O'Brian as a customer.

Track listing

Digital download / streaming
 "Unholy" – 2:36

Digital download / streaming (Instrumental)
 "Unholy" (Instrumental) – 2:37

Digital download / streaming (Live version)
 "Unholy" (Live version) – 2:38

Digital download / streaming (Disclosure remix)
 "Unholy" (Disclosure remix) – 3:54

Digital download / streaming (Arcaze remix)
 "Unholy" (Acraze remix) – 2:56

Digital download / streaming (Orchestral version)
 "Unholy" (Orchestral version) – 2:46

Digital download / streaming (Dxrk ダーク remix)
 "Unholy" (Dxrk ダーク remix) – 2:09

Digital and streaming EP
 "Unholy" – 2:36
 "Unholy" (Disclosure Remix) – 3:54
 "Unholy" (Dxrk ダーク Remix) – 2:09
 "Unholy" (Acraze Remix) – 2:56
 "Unholy" (Orchestral Version) – 2:46
 "Unholy" (Live Version) – 2:38
 "Unholy" (Instrumental) – 2:37

Digital download / streaming (Nova Twins remix)
 "Unholy" (Nova Twins remix) – 2:58

Digital download / streaming (David Guetta acid remix)
 "Unholy" (David Guetta acid remix) – 2:50

Digital download / streaming (Sped up remix)
 "Unholy" (Sped up remix) – 2:16

Charts

Weekly charts

Monthly charts

Year-end charts

Certifications

Release history

References

2022 songs
2022 singles
2022 in LGBT history
Sam Smith (singer) songs
Kim Petras songs
Billboard Global 200 number-one singles
Billboard Global Excl. U.S. number-one singles
Billboard Hot 100 number-one singles
Canadian Hot 100 number-one singles
Number-one singles in Australia
Number-one singles in Austria
Number-one singles in Greece
Number-one singles in New Zealand
Number-one singles in Singapore
Number-one singles in Turkey
Irish Singles Chart number-one singles
Songs written by Kim Petras
Songs written by Sam Smith (singer)
Songs written by Cirkut (record producer)
Songs written by Ilya Salmanzadeh
Songs written by Omer Fedi
Songs written by Jimmy Napes
Song recordings produced by Cirkut (record producer)
Song recordings produced by Ilya Salmanzadeh
Song recordings produced by Omer Fedi
UK Singles Chart number-one singles
Ultratop 50 Singles (Wallonia) number-one singles
Capitol Records singles
EMI Records singles
Songs about infidelity
Music videos directed by Floria Sigismondi
Vocal duets
Grammy Award for Best Pop Duo/Group Performance
Synth-pop songs
Electropop songs
Juno Award for Video of the Year videos
Alternative pop songs
Contemporary R&B songs